Soosthi is a 2020 Sri Lankan Sinhala drama road movie directed by Kushan Weerarathne and produced by Udara Palliyaguruge for Guththila Strategic Solutions. It stars Kalana Gunasekara and Samanalee Fonseka in lead roles along with W. Jayasiri, Maureen Charuni and Disni Rajapaksa in supportive roles. Music composed by Asha Rajapaksha. This is the debut film by Kushan Weerarathne.

The film received mixed reviews from critics.

Plot

Cast
 Kalana Gunasekara as Malaka 		
 Samanalee Fonseka as Soosa		
 W. Jayasiri as Soosa's father	
 Maureen Charuni as Soosa's mother		
 Disni Rajapaksa

References

External links
 
 Soosthi at Digital Identity of Sinhala Cinema
 Soosthi
 Soosthi premier
 ‘සූස්ති’ දැල්වුණු හැටි

2020s Sinhala-language films
2020 films
Sri Lankan drama films
2020 drama films